Martina Walther (born 5 October 1963 in Zeulenroda) is a German rower.

References 
 
 

1963 births
Living people
East German female rowers
Olympic rowers of Germany
Rowers at the 1988 Summer Olympics
Olympic gold medalists for East Germany
Olympic medalists in rowing
Medalists at the 1988 Summer Olympics
World Rowing Championships medalists for East Germany
People from Zeulenroda-Triebes
Sportspeople from Thuringia